Abercorn Creek is a stream in the U.S. state of Georgia. It is a tributary to the Savannah River.

Abercorn Creek took its name from the now-extinct 18th-century settlement of Abercorn, which in turn was named after the Duke of Abercorn.

References

Rivers of Georgia (U.S. state)
Rivers of Effingham County, Georgia